Royal High School is a public high school located in Royal City, Washington that serves 417 students in grades 9–12. 77% of the students are Hispanic, while 22% are white.

References

External links
Royal H.S.
Royal School District #160

Public high schools in Washington (state)
High schools in Grant County, Washington